Higher Ground is the twenty-seventh studio album by American country music singer-songwriter Tammy Wynette. It was released on July 6, 1987, by Epic Records.

Recording
"A Slow Burning Fire" is a cover of a song recorded by country music artist George Jones on his 1984 album, Ladies' Choice.

Commercial performance
The album peaked at No. 43 on the Billboard Top Country Albums chart. The album's lead single, “Your Love” reached No. 12 on the Billboard Hot Country Singles chart. The second single from the album, “Talkin’ to Myself Again” peaked at No. 16, and the third and final single, “Beneath a Painted Sky” peaked at No. 25.

Track listing

Personnel
Adapted from liner notes.

Musicians
Eddie Bayers - drums
Steve Buckingham - guitar
Mark Casstevens - guitar
Rodney Crowell - harmony vocals (track 10)
Jerry Douglas - dobro
Paul Franklin - steel guitar,  dobro
Lary Gatlin - harmony vocals (track 6)
Rudy Gatlin - harmony vocals (track 6)
Steve Gatlin - harmony vocals (track 6)
Steve Gibson - guitar
Vince Gill - harmony vocals (track 5)
Vern Gosdin - duet vocals (track 3)
Emmylou Harris - harmony vocals (track 4)
Roy Huskey - upright bass
Randy McCormick - piano
Mark O'Connor - fiddle, mandolin, guitar
The O’Kanes- harmony vocals (track 7)
Paul Overstreet - harmony vocals (track 9)
John Wesley Ryles - harmony vocals (track 8)
Tom Robb - bass guitar
Ricky Van Shelton - harmony vocals (track 8)
Ricky Skaggs - harmony vocals (track 1)
Jeanne Smith - harmony vocals (track 10)
Jay Spell - accordion
Harry Stinson - harmony vocals (track 8)
Gene Watson - harmony vocals (track 2)
Dennis Wilson - harmony vocals (track 8)
Tammy Wynette - lead vocals

Technical
Randy Best - assistant engineer
Steve Buckingham - producer
Joe Bogan - recording engineer
Michael Koreiba - assistant engineer
McGuire - album photography
Denny Purcell - mastering
Dennis Richey - assistant engineer
George Richey - management
Teri Serletie - production assistant
Lee Waters - assistant engineer

Chart positions

Album

Singles

References

1987 albums
Epic Records albums
Tammy Wynette albums
Albums produced by Steve Buckingham (record producer)